Ridgeley is an unincorporated community in Dodge County, Nebraska, United States.

History
A post office was established at Ridgeley in 1868. Ridgeley was likely named for a settler.

References

Unincorporated communities in Dodge County, Nebraska
Unincorporated communities in Nebraska